The 1958 season was the Hawthorn Football Club's 34th season in the Victorian Football League and 57th overall.

Fixture

Night Series Cup

The night series went back to the format with only the teams that didn't qualify for finals competing in the series.

Premiership Season

Ladder

References

Hawthorn Football Club seasons